Lee John Brearley (born 9 June 1980) is a British former trampolinist who was a competitor in the 2000 Summer Olympics. Lee finished 6th place in the Men's Individual Trampolining in 2000 for Great Britain.

See also
 Gymnastics at the 2000 Summer Olympics – Men's trampoline

References

External links
 

1980 births
Living people
British male trampolinists
Gymnasts at the 2000 Summer Olympics
Olympic gymnasts of Great Britain
Sportspeople from Manchester
Competitors at the 2001 World Games
21st-century British people